Utzon is a Danish surname that may refer to the following notable people:
Einar Utzon-Frank (1888–1955), Danish sculptor
Jan Utzon (born 1944), Danish architect, son of Jørn
 Jørn Utzon (1918–2008), Danish architect
Utzon Center in Aalborg, Denmark
Utzon's House in Hellebæk
Kim Utzon (born 1957), Danish architect, son of Jørn
Lin Utzon (born 1946), Danish designer, daughter of Jørn

Danish-language surnames